Possum Trot Creek is a stream in Crawford and Iron counties in the U.S. state of Missouri. It is a tributary of Huzzah Creek.

The stream headwaters arise in the northwest corner of Iron County just northwest of Viburnum (at ) and the stream flows northwest to its confluence with Huzzah Creek in Crawford County (at ). Mill Rock Creek enters the Huzzah just downstream from Possum Trot Creek.

Possum Trot Creek, also called Possum Creek, was named for the fact it was a favorite hunting ground of opossums by early settlers.

See also
List of rivers of Missouri

References

Rivers of Crawford County, Missouri
Rivers of Iron County, Missouri
Rivers of Missouri